Gehler is a German surname. Notable people with the surname include:

Johann Carl Gehler (1732–1796), German physician, mineralogist, and anatomist
Johann Samuel Traugott Gehler (1751–1795), German lawyer and physicist
Michael Gehler (born 1962), Austrian historian

See also
Geller

German-language surnames